Gabriel Miguel Guerra (born 17 April 1993) is an Argentine footballer who is currently playing for Sarawak United in the Malaysia Premier League.

Career Statistics

Club

Honours
PKNS

Malaysian FA Cup : Runners-up 2016
Malaysia Premier League : Runners-up 2016

Johor Darul Ta'zim

Malaysia Super League : 2017
Malaysia Cup  : 2017

References

External links
 
 Profile at Soccerpunter

1993 births
Living people
Argentine footballers
Argentine expatriate footballers
Expatriate footballers in Malaysia
PKNS F.C. players
Sarawak United FC players
Malaysia Super League players
Association football forwards
Footballers from Buenos Aires